Daniel Roberdeau (1727 – January 5, 1795) was an American Founding Father and merchant residing in Philadelphia, Pennsylvania, at the time of the American War of Independence. He represented Pennsylvania from 1777 to 1779 in the Continental Congress, where he signed the Articles of Confederation. Roberdeau served as a brigadier general in the Pennsylvania state militia during the war.

Family and early life
Roberdeau was born in 1727 on the Island of St. Christopher in the West Indies. His father was a Huguenot immigrant named Isaac Roberdeau; his mother, a Scot, Mary Cunningham. After the death of his father, he immigrated to Philadelphia with his mother and sisters. Roberdeau became a timber merchant.

Early service
Roberdeau was active in establishing Freemasonry in Philadelphia, which brought him to the attention of Benjamin Franklin and other civic leaders. He served on the Board of Managers for Pennsylvania Hospital in Philadelphia in 1756-1757. He was elected to the Pennsylvania Colonial Assembly, serving from 1756 to 1760, but then declined further service.

Revolutionary War service
When war neared, he joined the Associators (as the Pennsylvania rebel militia was known) and was made colonel of his regiment. In May 1776 he presided at several public meetings calling for the existing Pennsylvania delegation to the Continental Congress to be replaced with members who supported a Declaration of Independence. As a result, he was named to the Committee of Safety, and on July 4, 1776 was named a brigadier general in the state militia.

Congressional service
Roberdeau was first elected to the Continental Congress in February 1777 and served there until 1779. Later that year, when the Continental Army entered winter quarters at Valley Forge, he worked with General George Washington to set up a militia support network known as the Flying Camp and served as its commander.

In April 1778, Roberdeau took a short leave from Congress. He had noted the shortage of powder and shot in the army and used the time off to establish a lead mine in what was then a part of Bedford County, now a part of Blair County. To protect the mine and camp from Indian attacks, he built a palisade, Fort Roberdeau, at his own expense.  Historically, Roberdeau's fort was known as the "Lead Mine Fort".  It has been reconstructed near its original site in Sinking Valley, near present-day Altoona, Pennsylvania.

After the war, he moved to Alexandria, Virginia, and eventually settled in Winchester, where he died in 1795. He is buried in the Mt. Hebron Cemetery there. His son, Isaac Roberdeau, became a civil engineer and U.S. Army officer, who helped Pierre L'Enfant lay out the plan for Washington, D.C.

References

External links
 

1727 births
1795 deaths
Continental Congressmen from Pennsylvania
18th-century American politicians
Signers of the Articles of Confederation
Businesspeople from Philadelphia
Huguenot participants in the American Revolution
American people of French descent
British emigrants to the Thirteen Colonies
Militia generals in the American Revolution
Pennsylvania militiamen in the American Revolution
Members of the Pennsylvania Provincial Assembly
People from Saint Kitts
Saint Kitts and Nevis people of British descent
People of colonial Pennsylvania
American slave owners
Burials at Mount Hebron Cemetery (Winchester, Virginia)
Founding Fathers of the United States